Charlie Buckingham (born January 16, 1989 in Newport Beach, California) is an American Olympic sailor. He competed at the 2016 Summer Olympics in Rio de Janeiro, in the men's Laser class where he finished 11th. He also competed at the Tokyo 2020 Summer Olympics in the men's Laser class.

He was named College Sailor of the Year in 2009 and 2011 while competing for Georgetown University.

References

External links
 
 
 
 

1989 births
Living people
American male sailors (sport)
Olympic sailors of the United States
Sailors at the 2016 Summer Olympics – Laser
Sailors at the 2020 Summer Olympics – Laser
Pan American Games medalists in sailing
Pan American Games bronze medalists for the United States
Sailors at the 2015 Pan American Games
Sailors at the 2019 Pan American Games
Medalists at the 2019 Pan American Games
ICSA College Sailor of the Year
Newport Harbor High School alumni
Georgetown Hoyas sailors
Sportspeople from Newport Beach, California